Intervensie is the first studio album by progressive indie rock band Foto na Dans. The album was nominated for a SAMA (South African Music Award)

Track listing
 Betwyfel Beweging	
 Oorywerige Gelowige	
 Intervensie	
 Hou Jou Hande Bymekaar	
 Soldaatvolk (Akoesties)		
 Vergeet Van My	
 Die Wals		
 Die Ligte Skadu	
 Met 'n Laaste Asem		
 Verkleur En Vermom	
 Oggendstilte	
 Oorwinning Sonder Prys

References

2007 debut albums
Foto na Dans albums